Baranamtarra was the Queen of Lagash during the 24th century BCE.

In 2384 BCE, Baranamtarra and her husband, Lugalanda, seized power of Lagash, one of the oldest cities in Sumer. They became the largest landholders in the city, and Baranamtarra presided over a temple and several estates herself. Queen Baranamtarra managed her own private estates and those of the temple of the goddess Bau. She bought and sold slaves and sent diplomatic missions to neighboring states.

Records that still exist today reflect the private business activities of the royal wife during Lagash’s great age of international trade and prosperity. Baranamtara sent woolen clothes and silver to Dilmun and sold copper imported from Dilmun in the neighboring city of Umma. In keeping with the standard practices of international merchants, she dedicated a bronze statue to the goddess Nanshe. For her estates, which marketed milk products, Baranamtara purchased cattle in Elam. The expression “property of Baranamtara” is found on lists of people, animals, estates, and various objects.

Due to the political instability at the time, they in turn were overthrown by another ruler, Urukagina, in 2378.

References

Sumerian people
24th-century BC women
Ancient queens consort
Ancient landowners
Ancient businesswomen